The canton of Gaillard is an administrative division of the Haute-Savoie department, southeastern France. It was created at the French canton reorganisation which came into effect in March 2015. Its seat is in Gaillard.

It consists of the following communes:

Arthaz-Pont-Notre-Dame
Bonne
Cranves-Sales
Étrembières
Gaillard
Juvigny
Lucinges
Machilly
Saint-Cergues
Vétraz-Monthoux

References

Cantons of Haute-Savoie